Otto Wilhelm Elfving (12 April 1874 in Turku – 14 October 1944) was a Finnish metal worker and politician. He was a member of the Parliament of Finland from 1919 to 1922 and again from 1926 to 1927, representing the Social Democratic Party of Finland (SDP).

References

1874 births
1944 deaths
People from Turku
People from Turku and Pori Province (Grand Duchy of Finland)
Social Democratic Party of Finland politicians
Members of the Parliament of Finland (1919–22)
Members of the Parliament of Finland (1924–27)
Metalworkers